The Maharashtra cricket team is a state cricket team that represents the Maharashtra state in domestic cricket of India. It is govern by Maharashtra Cricket Association. It plays its home matches at Maharashtra Cricket Association Stadium in Pune. 

As of 3 October 2022, Maharashtra have won Ranji trophy 2 times and remained runner up 3 times, won Syed Mushtaq Ali Trophy 1 time, remained runner up 1 time. In Vijay Hazare trophy it has been winner in West zone in 1994–95.

History 

Maharashtra was one of the 15 teams that competed in the first Ranji Trophy tournament in 1934–35, when, captained by D. B. Deodhar, it lost its inaugural match narrowly to Bombay. It has competed ever since, winning twice and finishing runners-up three times. Maharashtra won two consecutive Ranji trophies in 1939-40 and 1940-41 defeating United Province and Madras cricket team in the final respectively. It remained runner-up 3 times, in 1970-71 season it lost against Bombay cricket team, in 1992-93 against Punjab and in 2013-14 season versus Karnataka in the final and remained runner up.

Maharashtra's player Bhausaheb Nimbalkar scored record 443 in an inning in 1948 Ranji trophy, the record still stands and is still the highest Ranji trophy and first class score by an Indian. 

As of February 2021 Maharashtra had played 395 times in the Ranji Trophy, winning 98, losing 75, and drawing 222 times.

In 1994-95 Vijay Hazare Trophy this team was winner of West zone.

Historically Maharashtra cricket team has been played its home matches at Poona Gymkhana Ground, Nehru stadium in Pune. Since Maharashtra cricket association built its own International cricket stadium at Gahunje outside Pune, it plays its home matches at 'Maharashtra Cricket Association stadium' (also known as MCA stadium).

Maharashtra team won its first Syed Mushtaq Ali Trophy, a premier T20 domestic cricket tournament in 2009–10. It defeated Hyderabad cricket team in the final by 19 runs. In 2018-19 season it lost against Karnataka cricket team in the final.

Famous players

Some famous cricketers from Maharashtra cricket team are:
Vijay Hazare
D. B. Deodhar
Chandu Borde
Chetan Chauhan
Abhijit Kale
Santosh Jedhe 
Surendra Bhave
Dnyaneshwar Agashe
Hemant Kanitkar
Hrishikesh Kanitkar
B. B. Nimbalkar
Munaf Patel
Vasant Ranjane
Ashutosh Agashe
Madhusudan Rege
Iqbal Siddiqui
Yajurvindra Singh
Ranga Sohoni
Shantanu Sugwekar
Rahul Tripathi 
Kedar Jadhav
Ruturaj Gaikwad
Sanskar Joshi
Milind Gunjal
Bharat solanki
Harshad Khadiwale
Ankit Bawne

Current squad 

Players with international caps are listed in bold.

Updated as on 24 January 2023

Coaching staff
Maharashtra cricket team's coaching staff are:
 Head coach: Santosh Jedhe
 Bowling Coach: Shadab Jakati
 Assistant coach: Akshay Tandale
 Physio: Vaibhav Daga
 Trainer: Mahesh Patil

See also

 Sport in India - overview of sport in India
 Cricket in India

References

External links
Cricinfo's Complete History of the Indian Domestic Competitions

Indian first-class cricket teams
Cricket in Maharashtra
Sport in Maharashtra
Cricket clubs established in 1934
1934 establishments in India